Laltluangliana Khiangte is a Mizo academic, playwright and poet of Mizo literature. He was the principal of the Serampore College and a former professor at Pachhunga University College and the North Eastern Hill University. He is presently serving as the senior most professor at the Department of Mizo at Mizoram University. He is a recipient of the Pu Buanga Award, the highest literary award of the Mizo Academy of Letters. The Government of India awarded him the fourth highest civilian honour of the Padma Shri, in 2006, for his contributions to Indian literature.

Biography 
Laltluangliana Khiangte is a well-known playwright-dramatist, poet, scholar-critic, essayist, biographer and folklorist from the state of Mizoram. He has taken life as known to the Mizo tribal society as his subject and fictionalized it, thus instituting a different genre especially in the field of playwriting. He has not only achieved distinction of being recognized as a playwright and poet but is also one of the most prominent writers and folklorists of North East India. He has received many awards for his remarkable contribution to the development and growth of Mizo language and literature. He was born on 28 June 1961 to a Presbyterian church elder Tlanghmingthanga (formerly teacher and Synod Music Instructor) of Khiangte clan and Mrs. Darngeni of Khawlhring clan. Being born and brought up in Christian home and since he had attended Sunday School at the age of 4 till 18 years of age, he became Sunday School teacher in different stages of learning right from 1976 till 2012, and he had undergone the required Biblical training courses for a number of times.

His literary artistry comes to the fore in his writings on varied fields such as literature, culture, folklore, socio-religious studies, sports and social education including journalistic writings with equal ease and perfection. For his remarkable and historical contribution to Mizo language and literature, he has been selected for Padma Shri (in Literature and Education) for the year 2006 by the President of India. Prior to this, in addition to other decorations, he was also given two other National Awards viz. Rashtriya Lok Bhasha Samman-2003 & Bharat Adivasi Samman-2005 by the Ramnika Foundation and All India Tribal Literary Forum.

A regular choir member since 1975 till 2000 and he had even served as conductor of the choir for some years visiting different places of India as member of the singing group. An active member in Christian youth movement for 27 years, he had served as youth leader for about 20 years in different capacities even in North East and the whole of India. As a former secretary of Presbyterian Youth Fellowship of India and that of North East India Christian Council youth, he had taken an active part in the socio-religious, cultural, moral and educational programmes and he was also the president of NEICC Youth Assembly for three terms. He was convener of Civil Rights Committee under NEICC, former executive member in North East India Christian Council for three terms, and a church elder with important engagements in God's mission in various capacities. As an active Christian youth leader, he had also attended the grand Presbyterian Youth Triennium at Purdue University, US, in 1995 as a special fraternal delegate from India.

His books and other writings had clearly depicted his deeper involvement for ecumenical and inter-denominational zeal as well as his participations in the world-wide evangelisation as a member of the community of women and men in mission. And of course, as an editor and writer, while serving as youth leader for a quarter of a century, he had recorded his experiences and other valuable information in the form of educational books for future generations. All his contributions and involvements in socio-cultural and religious activities cannot be mentioned in detail herewith.

His exemplary contribution in the field of playwriting and theatre direction has been recognized with the award of the Distinguished Playwright Award-2002 and Rastriya Lok Bhasha Samman-2003. His contributions towards nurturing nationalistic sentiments in the field of language and literature have been appropriately recognised with the K.Zawla Award-2007 and Khuangchera Award-2000. He has written more than 30 plays (including short plays), out of which 24 have been published. 

As a Noted Playwright-dramatist, he was awarded India Tribal Drama Award-2012 on 16- November 2012. Ten of his plays and more than ten of his essays and poems have been prescribed as texts for different stages of studies under four Universities of North East India. He has 58 books in English and Mizo, 34 Edited books in English and Mizo, 27 booklets in Mizo & English and about 14 of his books have been translated into Hindi, Bengali, Assamese, Khasi, Manipuri, Garo, Bodo etc.

His plays, articles, essays and poems have been translated into Hindi, Bengali, Assamese, Kokborok and his play Chharmawia has been serialised for Doordarshan. Three of his long plays and Seven Short plays have been translated into Hindi. He has also been acclaimed as Writer of the year in the years 2002, 2003 and 2004 by the popular opinion poll conducted by Lelte Weekly in Mizoram. His play – Pasaltha Khuangchera was also declared as the Mizo Book of the Year in 1997. 
His contribution in the field of drama and theatre has been recognised by the Sangeet Natak Akademi with its Purushkar-2018 (an Award instituted by the National Academy of Music, Dance & Drama) in the field of playwrighting).

Professor Khiangte has also edited a literary journal called Thu leh Hla(Monthly) and other journals including Hruaitu(Monthly). His articles have also been published in various journals of India including Sahitya Akademi's Indian Literature and Mumbai's Midday, Bangladesh's Bharat Bachitra etc. in English and in Yudhrat Aam Admi in Hindi and several popular journals and edited volumes. Five of his plays had been translated into Hindi for wider readership in India. He is the present Editor-in-Chief of Mizo Studies, a quarterly refereed journal with  published by the Department of Mizo, Mizoram University.

He has been awarded Fellow Membership (FUWAI) by the United Writers Association of India; decorated with Distinguished Leadership Award-1997 ABI, USA; included in the International Who’s Who – 1997 by IBC; included in Asia / Pacific Who’s Who (2000) Cambridge UK and the Indian National Sahitya Akademi included his bio-data in the latest Who’s Who of Indian Writers, 1999 edition. He has also been included in the edition of Directory of Eminent Writers of the North East India and Reference Asia: Asia’s Who’s Who of Men & Women of Achievement and also in the Indigenous Writers of India. 

He has presented more than 320 papers in Seminars, Consultations, Training and Workshops, of which more than 170 are written in English for the International, National, Regional programmes. He has published over 100 research papers and contributed more than 1000 articles / essays / poems in different journals and magazines of the country, published in various Indian languages.

A former member of the General Council of Indian National Sahitya Akademi (2003-2007) and Sangeet Nataak Akademi (2004-2008) and Vice-President of All India Tribal Literary Forum, he is also an active Member of Indian Folklore Congress. He also continues to be active in the North East Writer Forum, Tribal Literary Conference of India, Community of women and men in Mission (under Council for World Mission). He has been involved in various capacities in Mizo Literature & Language Teachers Academy, Mizo Academy of Letters, Zoppen Club International, Mizo Writers Association, Mizo History Association, North East India Oral Literature Centre etc.

He is a life member of INTACH (Indian National Trust for Art & Cultural Heritage), YMCA (Young Men's Christian Association), YMA (Young Mizo Association), Leprosy Mission of India, Mizo Academy of Letters, United Writers Association of India, All India Tribal Literary Forum, Indian Society of Authors, Tribal Literary Forum of India, Gideons International etc. and the chief patron member of the Bible Society of India.

His invaluable contributions to the promotion of tribal language, folklore and literature are deemed a noteworthy addition to Indian literature in Mizo. He taught Mizo language and literature in Aizawl's premier institution of learning, Pachhunga University College, from 1985. He joined the postgraduate department of Mizo as a reader in 1999 under North Eastern Hill University (NEHU), Mizoram Campus, and became a full-fledged professor in 2005. Khiangte obtained his Ph.D. in literature in 1991 and D.Litt. in folklore in 1999 and also D.D. (Doctor of Divinity-honoris causa) in 2012 (March).

A former dean, School of Education & Humanities, and executive council member of Mizoram University, ex-principal and secretary of the Council of Serampore College (University), Khiangte is the senior most professor in the Department of Mizo, MZU. He was an active member of CABE (Central Advisory Board of Education: India) & National Monitoring Committee for Education of SCs, STs and Persons with Disabilities (2012-2015), national member for Continuing Professional Development of Teachers (NEUPA), task force member for North East India (2012–2015) and former chairman of the Board of Studies-Mizo-MZU; chief editor of refereed journal Mizo Studies; active member of the executive board of All India Association for Christian Higher Education and former vice president in North East Writers Forum & TLFI, NEICCYA.

Presently serving as professor of Mizo Department in Mizoram University; a member of board of governors in ICFAI University Mizoram; a trained member of Assessors (National Assessment and Accreditation Council, Hqrs. Bangaluru, India) and Mizo Language Committee, Govt. of Mizoram, now actively working on in some projects for the enrichment of Mizo language and literature. He has been elected for the president of Mizo Academy of Letters (2017-2019), that is the State Academy of Mizoram. He is also the president of Tribal Literary Forum of India (TLFI) and vice president of All India Tribal Literary Forum (AITLF)

He is now residing in Fakrun, B-43, Mission Veng, Aizawl-796001, Mizoram, India.

Awards and honours 
Khiangte was awarded the Book of the Year by the Mizo Academy of Letters for his play, Pasalṭha Khuangchera in 1997. He is a three-time winner of the Lelte Best Writer Award, winning it in 2001 through 2003. He received the Rashtriya Lok Bhasa Sanman in 2003 and the Bharat Adivasi Sanman in 2005 and the Distinguished Playwright Award, in between. The Government of India awarded him with the civilian honour of the Padma Shri in 2006 and the Mizo Academy of Letters honoured him again in 2010, with the Pu Buanga Award, the highest literary award of the Academy, given once in five years. He is also a recipient of the K. Zawla Award in Literature (2007) and Khuangchera Award (2008).

The followings are some awards given to Khiangte:

 Rashtriya Lok Bhasha Samman in 2003 
 Bharat Adivasi Samman – 2005
 Padma Shri in Literature & Education in 2006
 Indian Tribal Drama Award -2012 (16 November 2012)
 National National Service Scheme Medal for Excellence 2011–2012
 Sahitya Shiromani (International) on 27–28 December 2014 at Trivandrum
 Dr. Sam Higginbottom Best Principal Award 2014-15 (31 January 2015)
 Surya Inter-Indian Language Award / Bhasha Samman-2017
 Sangeet Natak Akademi Award-2018 (Puraskar on Playwrighting)
 Ph.D. in 1991 (Literature-Drama), NEHU (Indian Central University).
 Doctor of Literature (D.Litt.) in 1999 (Folklore), Int. Univ. of Washington.
 Doctor of Divinity (D.D.) 12 March 2012, Trinity College & Seminary

Prizes and recognitions received

 Awarded 1st. Prize in State Level Drama Writing Competition in 1990 with cash incentive.
 Awarded Book of the Year-1997 in Mizoram with cash incentive. 
 Awarded Man of the Year (Top Five), Sabereka Khuangkaih Popular Poll-1998
 Awarded Distinguished Leadership Award-1998 by ABI
 Awarded FUWAI (Fellow) officially given by the United Writers Association of India Headquarters, Madras, 1999 
 Awarded Chawimawina Diploma (25 Yrs Distinguished Service) by MSSU: 2001
 Awarded Best Writer of Mizoram in 2001, 2002, 2003 by Lelte Weekly 
 Awarded Distinguished Playwright Award in 2004
 Awarded K.Zawla Award in Literature in 2007
 Awarded Khuangchera Award (Drama) in 2008.
 Awarded Outstanding Contribution Award in 2010.
 Awarded National Integration Memento & Citation in 2010
 Awarded Pu Buanga Award: Literary Award in 2010 with cash incentive
 Awarded Valued Son of Saitual-Centenary on 13 March 2015 at Aizawl
 Awarded Golden Jubilee Memento For Centurion Talker 2016, by Prasar Bharti-AIR
 Felicitated by Governor of Nagaland on 17 January 2017 (NEI Integration) at Guwahati
 Rashtriya Sanskriti Mahotsav-2017 Felicitation on 31 March 2017 (NEI Integration) at Guwahati, Assam
 Arunodoi North East Achiever's Felicitation on 17 September 2017 (NEI Integration) at New Delhi, India
 Several Other Prizes in Drama, Poetry, Essay Writing Competitions including books.

Published works

Books in English 
 English Poetry – Study Aid. p. 198, (Edited),1986 & p. 244, Aizawl: 1988.
 Mizo Drama-Origin, Development & Themes. p. 277 (Hard Bound), Cosmo Publications, New Delhi: 1993. (Released at New Delhi)
 Mizo Folklore-I: Folktales of Mizoram. p. 218, (Hard bound)Art &Culture Dept. and L.T.L. Publications, Aizawl:1997
 Songs of Precious Blood. p. 56 (PYF Song book-Edited) Aizawl: 2000
 The Golden Lines (Poems & Prose pieces) p. 153 L.T.L. Publications, Aizawl: 2000
 An Introduction of Mizo Literature (Papers & Poems-compiled) Aizawl: 2001
 Memorable Poems & Essays (Study Aid-Edited), Aizawl: 2001& 2004
 Mizo Songs and Folk Tales, Published by the Sahitya Akademi, (p. 171, Released at New Delhi: 2002
 World Literature (Collection of Poems & Essays-Edited) p. 191, Aizawl: 2005;Revised & Enlarged Kolkata, West Bengal: 2011.
 Joy to the world Peace Festival (Handbook-cum-Song book-Edited) p. 130, Aizawl: 2005 
 Capt. L.Z. Sailo: Padma Bhushan Awardee (Biography) p. 126 L.T.L. Publication: 2007 & Revised & Enlarged, Kolkata: 2011
 Mizos of North East India: Culture, Folklore, Language, Literature. p. 216, 2008, First released at Mumbai, Maharashtra, India. 
 Unwritten Lesson & Other Poems (North East Poets’ Meet Handbook) p. 112, Aizawl: 2010
 Tribal Languages and Literature (Papers-Edited) p. 202. L.T.L. Publications, Aizawl: 2010
 Unsung Tribal Pastor & Writer (Memorable contribution of a Mizo Pastor), LTL Publications, Printed at Kolkata: 16 July 2011.
 A brief History of Mizo Drama & Theatre, L.T.L. Publications, 15 November 2012: Aizawl.
 Tribal Culture, Folklore and Literature, Mittal Publications, New Delhi: 2013  
 Pioneer Tribal Scholar-Pastor, ISPCK Publications: New Delhi: 2013 
 Expect and Attempt, Council of Serampore College Publication: 6 February 2014: Kolkata
 A Study of Mizo Novel, ISPCK Publication : New Delhi: 2014
 Mizo Folklore: Folktales of Mizoram, Written Words, Christian World Imprints Publication, New Delhi: 2017
 An Album of Books, KL Offset Printer, Aizawl: 2017
 Let-Us-Learn: Mizo-English-Hindi, p. 184, LTL Publications Aizawl: 2018 (Released by Governor of Nagaland on 18 October 2018)

Books in Mizo
 Thupui Zirbingte (Literature & Language workshop papers -Edited) p. 120, Aizawl:1989.
 Thupui Pawimawh Pali (Four Important Themes, M.L.A. Publication-Edited)Aizawl: 1989.
 Lehkhabu Ramtiam (The World of Literature, Culture & Arts) p. 230, Aizawl: 1993.
 Thalai Chanchin (Origin, development, various activities of Christian Youth Association), GCCS No.9.p. 230: 1993
 Chanchintha Meichher (The Gospel Torch: Selected play for Gospel Centenary Celebration in 1994, acted in all over Mizoram) p. 100, Aizawl: 1993.
 Lemchan Khawvel –I (The World of Drama: Three plays) p. 172, L.T.L. Publications, Aizawl:1994.
 Thuhlaril-Literary trends and History of Mizo Literature. p. 267.Edited -1995 / 2005,  (paperback: 2018)
 Biakliana Robawm(Writer, Poet, Novelist & his works. p. 266, L.T.L. Publications, Aizawl: 1996,  (2017)
 Pasaltha Khuangchera (The Great patriot & Indian freedom fighter) p. 218: 1997: Book of the year – 1997.  (2015)
 Infiamna Khawvel leh Rawngbawlna (Sport & Mission) (Missionary Training Text book), Mission Board Publication, Aizawl: 1998 
 Mizo Thuziak Thlan Chhuahte (Selected Essays-Edited) L.T.L. Publications, Aizawl 1999.
 Mizo Hlahril Thlan Chhuahte (Selected Poems-Edited) Aizawl: 1999.
 Liangkhaia Lungphun. (Pillars of Rev. Liangkhaia. p. 412, L.T.L. Publications, Aizawl, Dec.2000.
 Chantual Ennawm –I (Collection of plays) L.T.L. Publications, Aizawl: 2001
 Thlifim (Breeze: Collection of Poems), L.T.L. Publications, Aizawl 2001.
 Hamlet leh a ziaktu (Hamlet and its writer) L.T.L. Publications, Aizawl 2002.
 Thlaler Nula (Desert's Maid: Writer & her Works) p. 310, L.T.L. Publications, Aizawl: 2002.
 Zalenpar –I (Collection of fifty Literary Essays) p. 384, L.T.L. Publications, Aizawl:2003. 
 Lunghlu (Golden Jubillee Souvenir of the Writer's parents) L.T.L. Publications.Aizawl: 2004.
 Mizo Lehkhabu Zempui (A compendium of Mizo Bibliography-Edited) Aizawl:2005
 Rochuam (Collection of own poems & articles) p. 184, L.T.L. Publications, Aizawl: 2006
 Khawlkungi leh a kutchhuak (Authoress and her works) L.T.L. Publications, p. 247, Aizawl: 2007 & 2011
 Korea & Ramfan Thukhawchang (Traveloque), L.T.L. Publications, p. 293, Aizawl:2009.
 Mizo Hla leh Chhamhlate (Study of Songs & Poems),L.T.L. Publications, p. 210, Aizawl:2009
 Rangka Dârtui Luan (Golden Jubilee Commemoration) L.T.L. Publications, p. 100, Aizawl: 2010
 Chantual Ennawm-2, (Collection of Short plays) L.T.L. Publications, p. 232, Aizawl: 2012
 Kâkpui Pathum (Biography of 3 Honorary Doctorate Degree holders, released on 16 May 14 by the moderator of the PCI, Mizo Synod)
 Sulzâm, (Collection of Essays & Traveloque) , Aizawl: 2015.
 Thu leh hla thlitfimna lam (Literary Criticism), p. 330. . Aizawl: 2016 Released on 16 May 2016. 
 Chantual Ennawm – 3: Milim Pathum, (Collection of Short plays) p. 210,  Aizawl: 2016. Released on 14 September 2016.
 Thang-Zui (Author & His Works: Lalzuithanga) p. 180,  Aizawl, 2016. 
 Zonu Cheipar – 1 Ngur-Lian: H.Lalngurliani leh a kutchhuak, p. 257, L.T.L. Publications, Aizawl: 2017
 Za-Thum (Birth Centenary Volume of 3-Prose Writers) L.T.L. Publications, Aizawl:2017
 William Shakespeare Leh A Hnuhma (Shakespeare & his Hamlet in Mizo) , Aizawl: 2018 (Released by Governor on 19 October 2018)
 Zacham Par-chhuang (Birth Centenary Volume) , L.T.L. Publications, Aizawl: 2018 (Released by Governor of Nagaland on 18 October 2018)
 Liangah Khai ang aw, (Rev. Liangkhaia nuna thil thleng & kum pawimawhte) 17 October 2019.
 Dar-Tlang-Mal, (Memorial Stone Souvenir) Released on 1st. November 2019.

 Hmangaih Lungdi (Lemchan Khawvel-3) LTL Publications, Aizawl 19 December 2019

Selected bibliography

See also 
 Mizo literature
 Serampore College

References

External links 
 

Recipients of the Padma Shri in literature & education
1961 births
Scholars from Mizoram
Mizo people
Indian male dramatists and playwrights
Indian male poets
Indian folklorists
Indian male essayists
North-Eastern Hill University alumni
Academic staff of the North-Eastern Hill University
Living people
20th-century Indian dramatists and playwrights
20th-century Indian poets
20th-century Indian essayists
Writers from Mizoram
20th-century Indian male writers
Recipients of the Sangeet Natak Akademi Award